Gina Chiarelli is a Canadian actress. Most associated with stage roles in Vancouver, British Columbia, she received a Genie Award nomination as Best Actress at the 26th Genie Awards in 2006 for her performance in the film See Grace Fly.

Early life and education 
Chiarelli was raised in East Africa while her parents were working as missionaries. She moved to Ontario at age 11 and later attended a boarding school. She graduated from the New School of Drama in Toronto and moved to Vancouver in 1989.

Career 
As a stage actress, Chiarelli won a Jessie Richardson Theatre Award in 1999 for her performance in Agnes of God, in 2006 for The Diary of Anne Frank, and in 2013 for Master Class. She has also had recurring roles in the television series Cold Squad, Da Vinci's Inquest and The Dead Zone, and appeared in the films Noroc, Deadly Little Secrets and Numb.

Filmography

Film

Television

References

External links

Canadian film actresses
Canadian television actresses
Canadian stage actresses
Actresses from Vancouver
Living people
Year of birth missing (living people)
Place of birth missing (living people)